The 2005 FINA Men's World Water Polo Championship Qualifier was a tournament to decide the remaining three competing nations from Europe for the eleventh edition of FINA Men's World Water Polo Championship, held in Montreal, Canada later that year. The event was staged in Imperia, Italy from January 4 to January 9, 2005.

Teams

GROUP A
 Belarus 
 
 

GROUP B

Preliminary round

Group A

Tuesday January 4, 2005 

Wednesday January 5, 2005 

Thursday January 6, 2005

Group B

Tuesday January 4, 2005 

Wednesday January 5, 2005 

Thursday January 6, 2005

Quarterfinals
Friday January 7, 2005

Semifinals
Saturday January 8, 2005

Finals
Friday January 7, 2005 — 7th place

Saturday January 8, 2005 — 5th place

Sunday January 9, 2005 — 3rd place

Sunday January 9, 2005 — 1st place

Final ranking

Croatia, Italy and Romania qualified for the FINA Men's World Water Polo Championship, held in Montréal, Canada, joining Australia, Canada, Germany, Greece, Hungary, Russia, Serbia and Montenegro, Spain, and the United States.

Individual awards
Most Valuable Player
???
Best Goalkeeper
???
Topscorer
???

References
  Results

Men's
W
International water polo competitions hosted by Italy